Cyrtodactylus raglai, the Ragla bent-toed gecko, is a species of gecko that is endemic to Vietnam.

References

Cyrtodactylus
Reptiles described in 2021
Taxa named by Larry Lee Grismer
Taxa named by Nikolay A. Poyarkov Jr.